Etihad, from the Arabic for "union" ( ʾIttiḥād), primarily refers to Etihad Airways, the second largest flag carrier airline of the United Arab Emirates.

Etihad may also refer to:

Entities associated with the United Arab Emirates
Etihad Rail, a railway company of the United Arab Emirates
Etihad Towers, a building complex in Abu Dhabi
Darwin Airline, a Swiss airline that operated under the brand name Etihad Regional

Related to sports sponsorships
City of Manchester Stadium, known as Etihad Stadium for sponsorship reasons
Etihad Campus, an area of Sportcity, Manchester including the stadium
Docklands Stadium, a stadium in Melbourne, known as Etihad Stadium for sponsorship reasons

See also
Al-Ittihad (disambiguation)